Nikolai Mikhailovich Maksimov (born 15 May 1956) is a retired officer of the Russian Navy.

His career has been spent mostly with the Northern Fleet, where he served as an officer aboard submarines, rising through the ranks to command nuclear-powered ballistic missile submarines. This was followed by staff appointments with the fleet's various submarine divisions, eventually becoming deputy commander of the Northern Fleet in 2005 and then its commander in 2007. During his time in command he oversaw various naval exercises, including those in 2008, which were the largest the Russian navy had held in the Atlantic since 1991.

Maksimov became chief of staff and first deputy commander of the troops of the Western Military District in 2011, before retiring from active military service in 2012.

Early service and education
Maksimov was born on 15 May 1956 in Bolgrad, Odessa Oblast, Ukrainian SSR, in the Soviet Union. In 2000 he graduated with a gold medal after two years of study at the Military Academy of the General Staff of the Armed Forces of Russia.

Maksimov's career has been spent mainly with the Northern Fleet, where he went from the commander of a departmental group aboard a submarine, to weapons commander, assistant commander between 1978 and 1985, and then senior assistant to the submarine commander between 1986 and 1992. He later served as commander of the Project 667A Navaga nuclear ballistic missile submarine K-137 Leninets between 1992 and 1993, followed by the Project 667BDRM Delfin nuclear ballistic missile submarine K-18 in 1993.

Staff appointments and fleet command

In 2002 he became commander of the 12th submarine squadron, holding the post until 2005, when he was appointed deputy commander of the Northern Fleet. With the appointment of the fleet's commander, Vladimir Vysotskiy, as Commander-in-Chief of the Navy, Vice-Admiral Maksimov became acting-commander of the Northern Fleet, and was confirmed in the post by presidential decree on 19 November 2007. As Northern Fleet commander, Maksimov was in charge of joint naval-air exercises with elements of the Northern and Black Sea Fleets in the Atlantic Ocean in January 2008. The exercises, the largest Russian military manoeuvres in the Atlantic since 1991, involved 11 vessels, including the aircraft carrier Admiral Kuznetsov and the guided missile cruiser Moskva, and 47 aircraft. Maksimov announced the intent of the exercises was to restore "Russia's naval presence in key operational areas of the world's oceans." The following year he oversaw the Northern Fleet's "Dvina" exercises, attended by Navy commander Vladimir Vysotskiy, President Dmitry Medvedev and Defence Minister Anatoliy Serdyukov.

Maksimov was appointed chief of staff and first deputy commander of the troops of the Western Military District on 30 March 2011, holding the post until his retirement from service on 29 October 2012. On 7 November 2012 he was appointed head of the N. G. Kuznetsov Naval Academy. He held this post until 17 May 2016, having been elected chairman of the International Association of Public Organizations of Navy Veterans and Submariners in December 2013.

Family and awards
Over his career Maksimov has been awarded the Order "For Service to the Homeland in the Armed Forces of the USSR" Third Class, the Order of Military Merit, the Order of Naval Merit, the Order "For Merit to the Fatherland" Fourth Class, and various medals. He is a Candidate of Military Sciences (к. воен. н. (PhD)). Maksimov is married, with two sons.

References 

1956 births
Living people
People from Bolhrad
Soviet Navy personnel
Russian admirals
Recipients of the Order of Military Merit (Russia)
Recipients of the Order "For Service to the Homeland in the Armed Forces of the USSR", 3rd class
Recipients of the Order of Naval Merit (Russia)
Recipients of the Order "For Merit to the Fatherland", 4th class
N. G. Kuznetsov Naval Academy alumni
Military Academy of the General Staff of the Armed Forces of Russia alumni